Holy Spirit Seminary is a Catholic provincial seminary for Queensland located in Brisbane, Australia.

Originally known as the Pius XII Provincial Seminary, it was founded in 1941 on top of Beehive Hill in the Brisbane suburb of Banyo, in a large Romanesque style building designed by Hennessy & Hennessy. The number of students peaked at 134 in 1967, but later gradually declined. In 2002, the seminary relocated to St Paschal's parish in Wavell Heights, and the building became the Brisbane campus of the Australian Catholic University.

By 2007 vocations were increasing, and Holy Spirit Seminary was re-founded by the Queensland bishops. In 2008 the Seminary returned to the grounds of the former seminary at Banyo, and is co-located with the Australian Catholic University's McAuley campus. The seminary serves the Catholic province of Queensland, covering the Cairns, Rockhampton, Townsville and Toowoomba dioceses as well as the Brisbane archdiocese.

Cardinal William Levada opened the new seminary campus following the completion of construction in May 2008 at a cost of $4.5 million.  Preaching at the dedication of the chapel, Cardinal Levada said "convestitum Spiritu Sancto" (clothed with the Holy Spirit) was more than a motto for the seminary.

There were eight resident students including five Africans and a further three students in pastoral placements. The seminary Rector, Father Michael McCarthy and the Vice-rector Fr Ken Howell were present.

In 2006 there were seven students for the whole of Queensland studying in the Seminary, including one man in his 60s.  Fr. McCarthy said a "desperate shortage" of priests across Queensland had prompted the church to look further afield. At that time the dioceses of Cairns, Townsville, Rockhampton and Toowoomba had no seminary students.  "The church cannot operate without priests and the seminaries in Nigeria are extraordinarily dynamic, packed with 600 and 700 students," Father McCarthy said.

Originally designed for 16 seminarians, it was extended in 2010 to accommodate the 31 men in training at that time.  In February 2012, six students entered the Seminary and in June 2012, eight more commenced: four for Brisbane, two for Townsville and two for Umuahia, Nigeria. In 2015 twenty students were studying there.

Monsignor Tony Randazzo, a former official of the Congregation for the Doctrine of the Faith, was appointed Rector of the seminary at the beginning of 2009. Currently the spiritual formation director is Fr. Paul Chandler O.Carm.

Monsignor John Grace, formerly Vicar General in the Diocese of Rockhampton, was appointed to the position of Rector in 2016. He had left the seminary as a young priest at the end of 1970. In February 2016, four new men joined the seminary, bringing the total number of students to 18. Among these students there were fourteen  from the Archdiocese of Brisbane, two from Diocese of Toowoomba and the Diocese of Townsville respectively, and one from Rockhampton although none from the Diocese of Cairns.

In 2017 five new seminarians joined the Seminary.

Each year the Seminary conducts the Xavier School of Mission for members of all Queensland dioceses. The School aims to "equip and form leaders" in Catholic evangelisation.

External links 
 Holy Spirit home page

References 

Seminaries and theological colleges in Australia